Rima Abdul Malak (born 11 February 1979) is a French-Lebanese politician who has been serving as Minister of Culture in the government of Prime Minister Élisabeth Borne since May 2022.

Early life 
Abdul Malak was born into a Lebanese Christian family. She fled with her family during the Lebanese Civil War.

Political career 
From 2012 to 2014, Abdul Malak worked as advisor on cultural affairs to Mayor of Paris Bertrand Delanoë.

From 2014 to 2018, Abdul Malak served as cultural attaché at the Consulate General of France, New York City.

From 2019 to 2022, Abdul Malak served as advisor on cultural affairs and communications to President Emmanuel Macron.

Abdul Malak was appointed to the French government as a Minister of Culture in May 2022.

On May 20, 2022, she was appointed Minister of Culture in the Élisabeth Borne government. She appoints Emmanuel Marcovitch as chief of staff. It undertakes to defend "cultural sovereignty, to invest in artistic education and to take up the challenge of the ecological transition in the artistic milieu" and to collaborate with the Minister of National Education, Pap Ndiaye, with a view to appeasement of memories by quoting the words of Emmanuel Macron ″It is neither a policy of repentance nor a policy of denial, it is a policy of recognition″.

References 

1979 births
Living people
People from Beirut
Lebanese Christians
Women government ministers of France
French Ministers of Culture
21st-century French politicians
21st-century French women politicians
Pantheon-Sorbonne University alumni
French people of Lebanese descent
People of the Lebanese Civil War
Knights of the Ordre national du Mérite
Members of the Borne government